Specification may refer to:
 Specification is the term used for the first stage in cellular differentiation
 Specification (technical standard), an explicit set of requirements
 Specification (legal concept), from Roman Law
 Formal specification, describing computer software by mathematical means
 Specification language
 Model specification, the practice of translating theory into a statistical model
 Patent specification, part of a patent application
 Regional specification, identifying different areas of the early embryo in biology

See also